Jean-Baptiste Dupy (born 23 December 1979) is a French lightweight rower. He won a gold medal at the 2001 World Rowing Championships in Lucerne with the lightweight men's eight.

References

1979 births
Living people
French male rowers
World Rowing Championships medalists for France
21st-century French people